"Blue Angel" is a song by Roy Orbison, released as a single in August 1960. Released as the follow-up to the international hit "Only the Lonely (Know the Way I Feel)", "Blue Angel" peaked at number nine on the Billboard Hot 100 and number eleven on the UK's Record Retailer Top 50.

Background and release
"Blue Angel" followed its predecessor, "Only the Lonely (Know the Way I Feel)", in very much the same style with Orbison once again able to show off his falsetto and semi-operatic vocals and also followed its theme of lost love. However, whilst "Only the Lonely" was a gloomy song of self-pity, "Blue Angel" was, according to musician and writer John Kruth, "a dollop of commercial fluff… [and that] lyrically, it was rather sappy, a trite knock-off about teen love, all too typical of its time. Its power lay in its simple but insidious melody."

Co-written with collaborator Joe Melson, Orbison recorded "Blue Angel"  in early August 1960 at RCA Victor Studio B in Nashville, Tennessee. It was then quickly released as a single at the end of August with the B-side "Today's Teardrops", written by a then-relatively unknown Gene Pitney. Whilst the single was first released on Monument Records in the US, its UK release came in October 1960 on parent label London Records when "Only the Lonely (Know the Way I Feel)" was top of the charts there.

Personnel
 Roy Orbison – vocals
 Hank Garland – guitar
 Harold Bradley – guitar
 Bob Moore – bass
 Buddy Harman – drums
 Floyd Cramer – piano
 Boots Randolph – saxophone
 Anita Kerr Singers – backing vocals

Charts

References

1960 singles
Roy Orbison songs
Songs written by Roy Orbison
Songs written by Joe Melson
Monument Records singles
Song recordings produced by Fred Foster
1960 songs